Actinopus guajara is a species of mygalomorph spider in the family Actinopodidae. It is currently known from the municipality of Guajará-Mirim in Rondônia, Brazil. The specific name guajara refers to its type locality.

The holotype, a male, measures  in total length.

References 

guajara
Spiders of Brazil
Endemic fauna of Brazil
Spiders described in 2020